Martí Vilà Garcia (born 26 May 1999) is a Spanish footballer who plays for FC Andorra. Mainly a left-back, he can also play as a left winger.

Club career
Born in Berga, Barcelona, Catalonia, Vilà joined FC Barcelona's La Masia in 2009, after stints at CE Manresa and CE Berga. He progressed through the youth setup and won the 2017–18 UEFA Youth League with the club, but was still released in 2018.

On 10 July 2018, Vilà signed for Segunda División side CF Reus Deportiu, being initially assigned to the reserves in Tercera División. He made his senior debut on 26 August, starting in a 1–2 home loss against FC Vilafranca.

Vilà made his professional debut on 30 September 2018, coming on as a first-half substitute for Fran Carbià in a 0–2 away loss against UD Almería. The following 11 July, he moved to another reserve team, Deportivo Fabril also in the fourth tier.

Honours

Club 
Barcelona
UEFA Youth League: 2017–18

References

External links

1999 births
Living people
People from Berguedà
Sportspeople from the Province of Barcelona
Spanish footballers
Footballers from Catalonia
Association football defenders
Segunda División players
Tercera División players
CF Reus Deportiu B players
CF Reus Deportiu players
Deportivo Fabril players
FC Andorra players